The BBC Two "Two" ident was the station identification used on BBC2 between 30 March 1986 and 16 February 1991. It was the last non-corporate look for the channel, and the only look until 2018 that did not feature a numeral '2' in the design.

Launch
Following their previous and groundbreaking striped 2 look, BBC Two wanted to go in a different programming direction. The ident they had commissioned had been around since 1979 and after seven years' service, it was time for a replacement. The channel wanted to aim programming that was more high brow and sophisticated. As a result, they wanted the new logo to reflect this. The BBC commissioned Alan Jeapes, who was responsible for the title sequence for BBC1's hit soap EastEnders the year before, to create the new look.

Components of the look
The ident for the look featured a white background with embossed, 3D lettering spelling out "TWO" in a stencil style font. The "TWO" are coloured red, green and blue to represent the phosphors of television, and was a device the channel had used before (they also represented the national colours of Wales, Northern Ireland and Scotland respectively). The upright part of the "T" was coloured red, the left hand diagonal of the "W" green and the middle diagonal blue. The "O" remained white, as did the remainder of the lettering. Similar to the last look, the lettering would either fade in from the background, fade out into the background, or remain on screen the whole time. There were no particular rules for which ident should be shown when, but the fade in and fade out versions were often used for the start and end of day respectively. For Subtitled programming, a small grey hard of hearing logo was located between the "T" and "W" of the "TWO", with the caption '888' situated below the logo.

A clock accompanied the look, as was common for the channel in these days. The clock had a white background, with embossed dashes at each position round the clock face. The "TWO" logo was placed below the clock, with the clock hands different colours: a red second hand, a green minute hand and a blue hour hand. The clock was electronically generated using the previous clock generator system and was often used before some news bulletins and before closedown. On this occasion, the clock would always fade to white, before fading to black.

The promotional style used with the look varied throughout the time. Promotions themselves featured no unifying look and changed with seasons. The only key factor was that the "TWO" logo would appear in some form at the end, but this was not always guaranteed. At this time, programme slides were still being used frequently in continuity on both channels. At the beginning of this period, the technology was not yet in place for electronic captions, meaning that the original caption design needed to work on optical slides: it therefore needed to be a simple design. The original design involved a black strip across the bottom of the screen which included the "TWO" on the left and the programme title on the right. Following the acquisition of Quantel Paintbox however, the slides were now electronically generated allowing the "TWO" to appear not only 3D but on a white background. The new design featured the bottom half of the screen in white with 3D logo and name, with the white background fading upwards into the picture, in a similar design to the previous version. This was later modified to a single white gradiented strip, the width of the "TWO" logo on the left hand side with the programme name overlaid the picture, which now occupies the whole of the screen. For cross promotional captions, BBC1 used a white caption, with the picture inside a box in the centre of the caption, with "TWO" logo and name located above the box. This style was not used on the main channel. This was created using old CG. But in 2010, The ident was recreated using 3D software.

This look also marked the first time that the regions could opt out of the main BBC2 schedule, following the move of some programming to the channel from BBC1. To differentiate, regional versions of the "TWO" ident were made, with the region name in grey over a static caption of the TWO logo.

Cancellation
In 1990, the newly recruited BBC2 controller, Alan Yentob, noticed that the logo for the channel, the "TWO", was affecting the reputation of BBC2. Surveys commissioned realised that most viewers thought the new look "dull" and "worthy". He then decided to commission a worthy successor capable of displaying the personality of the channel, revealing his thoughts in the How Do They Do That? episode - about the idents. The successors were introduced on 16 February 1991. However, in 2010, for the 80's season. the "TWO" logo made an appearance. And on 7 October 2013, this, along with others was brought back for BBC Two's "Afternoon Classics" block.

Special idents
BBC2 used a number of special idents through its years, mainly for use at Christmas. Special idents were commissioned for this.

Christmas 1986 – Snow constantly covers and uncovers the "TWO" in waves going left to right.
Christmas 1987 – A transparent ball hangs in front of the camera as two people throw snowballs at each other with backgrounds of trees. The ball then pans up to reveal an all-white "TWO" logo, with a red dash above and a large green triangle stretching the entire length of the TWO above that.
Christmas 1988 – A white-powdered person with green hair in the style of a Christmas tree cuts to a picture of a green and red "TWO" with the sections separated and frozen in ice.
Christmas 1989 – Three figures seemingly made of wrapping paper move the sections of the "TWO" into position, which themselves seen to be made out of wrapping paper in the logo colours. The end board is accompanied by a synthesised nursery tune and rotating sheep in the background.
Christmas 1990 – An upside-down triangle, square and circle burst open to reveal the letters TWO made out of items such as crackers, wheels and other assorted materials, accompanied by a soundtrack of two notes, the final note being dragged out for the length of the announcement. These idents were designed to follow on seamlessly from a similarly styled promotional trail.

A few other special idents were made:
A "TWO" ident recoloured blue and red, with occasional powdered colours of blue and red, was used to mark a series of programmes on the French Revolution. 
A version with the letter spelling "THE" was used before the first episode of The Late Show.
A spoof version of the logo, spelling "THREE" was used on BBC1 prior to their showing of Roland Rat - The series.

References

External links

1986 Idents page at TVARK
TVARK 1986 Continuity page
TV Room TWO idents
MHP idents on page
Ident Gallery Special Pres 2013

BBC Two
BBC Idents
Television presentation in the United Kingdom